Good Book, good books or The Good Book may refer to:

The Holy Bible
The Good Book Company, a Christian publishing company
The Good Book Press, a publishing company
The Good Book (album), a 1971 album by Melanie
The Good Book (book), a 2011 book by A. C. Grayling
GoodBooks, an English indie rock band

See also
 Book (disambiguation)
 Bad books (disambiguation)